Shandwick, a village near Tain in Easter Ross, and is in the Scottish council area of Highland, Scotland.

Hilton, Balintore, and Shandwick are known collectively as the Seaboard Villages. It is well known because of the nearby Clach a' Charridh or Shandwick Stone, a Class II Pictish stone.

External links
"Seaboard History Website'' - online archive of the social history of the Seaboard Villages; Hilton, Balintore, and Shandwick
Down to the Sea - online version of history book of Hilton, Balintore, and Shandwick

Populated places in Ross and Cromarty